The 2006 United States House of Representatives elections in Oregon were held on November 7, 2006 to select Oregon's representatives to the United States House of Representatives. All five seats were up for election in 2006, as they are every two years. All five incumbents were re-elected, four of them by large margins; only the 5th district was somewhat competitive.

Overview

District 1

Democratic primary

Candidates

Results

Republican primary

Candidates

Results

General election

Candidates

Results

Incumbent Democratic Congressman David Wu has represented this liberal-leaning district based in northwestern Oregon and part of Portland. This year, Congressman Wu, seeking his fourth term, crushed Republican candidate Derrick Kitts in the general election to win another term in Congress.

District 2

Democratic primary

Candidates

Results

Republican primary

Candidates

Results

General election

Candidates

Results
In this heavily conservative, eastern Oregon-based district, which is one of the largest districts in the country, incumbent Republican Congressman Greg Walden ran for a fourth term. Democratic candidate Carol Voisin, a professor at Southern Oregon University, faced uphill odds against Walden, and ultimately, she was defeated in a landslide election, along with Constitution Party candidate Jack Brown.

District 3

Democratic primary

Candidates

Results

Republican primary

Candidates

Results

General election

Candidates

Results

Democratic Congressman Earl Blumenauer, who has served in Congress since previous Congressman Ron Wyden was elected to the Senate in 1996, sought a sixth term in this staunchly liberal district based in Portland and its suburbs in Clackamas County. Blumenauer was challenged by Republican Bruce Broussard and Constitution Party candidate David Brownlow. As expected, Blumenauer was elected to another term by the largest margin of victory of any Oregon Congressman.

District 4

Democratic primary

Candidates

Results

Republican primary

Candidates

Results

General election

This liberal-leaning district, based in the southern Pacific coastline of Oregon and including Eugene, Springfield, and Coos Bay, has the potential for competitive elections. However, incumbent Democratic Congressman Peter DeFazio has represented the district for twenty years and has built up a repertoire among its denizens. Seeking an eleventh term, DeFazio crushed Republican opponent Jim Feldkamp to win.

Candidates

Results

District 5

Democratic primary

Candidates

Results

Republican primary

Candidates

Results

General election

Candidates

Results

This district, the most moderate in Oregon, covers portions of Portland, southern suburbs of Portland, some of the northern Pacific coast, and the state's capital, Salem. Congresswoman Darlene Hooley ran for a sixth term against businessman and former State House candidate Mike Erickson. In the closest election in Oregon that year, Hooley defeated Erickson by a fairly comfortable margin to serve her final term in Washington.

See also
 United States House of Representatives elections, 2006
 Oregon state elections, 2006
 Oregon gubernatorial election, 2006

References

Oregon

2006
House